Kertomenanggal Station (KTL) is a railway station located in Menanggal, Gayungan, Surabaya. This station is included in the Operation Area VIII Surabaya and is a railway station that is located in the southernmost city of Surabaya.

The location of this station is also close to one of the modern shopping centers in Surabaya called .

This station was inaugurated on 9 February 2004, along with the launch of the Delta Express by President Megawati Soekarnoputri. However, on 10 February 2021, the passenger service at this station was discontinued so that now not a single commuter train service stops at this station.

Services
Starting 10 February 2021 there will be no more passenger services at this station.

References

External links

Railway stations in Surabaya
Railway stations opened in 2004
Railway stations closed in  2021
Defunct railway stations in Indonesia
2004 establishments in Indonesia
2021 disestablishments in Indonesia